Presidential elections were held in Liberia in 1853. The result was a victory for incumbent President Joseph Jenkins Roberts.

References

Liberia
1853 in Liberia
Elections in Liberia
May 1853 events
Election and referendum articles with incomplete results